Monsonia is a genus of plants in the family Geraniaceae. It is named after Lady Anne Monson, 1714–76, known for her botanical knowledge and plant collecting in the Cape.

Description
Monsonia consists of herbs or undershrubs often with simple stem from woody rootstock or deep tap root; leaves toothed or divided; flowers regular, petals 5, separate, tip broad, blunt or slightly notched, stamens in 5 groups with 3 stamens in each, one longer than others, ovary 5 lobed; fruit beaked.

Taxonomy

Species

, the World Checklist of Selected Plant Families accepts 27 species:

Distribution
Distributed in Africa, Western Asia and East India, approximately 40 species, approximately 21 in South Africa.

Gallery

References

Geraniales genera
Geraniaceae